The Dawn Fraser Story is a 1964 documentary film about Australian swimmer Dawn Fraser. It was made by Joy Cavill, who later made a feature film about Fraser, Dawn! (1979), and had a romantic relationship with her. It is one of the few Australian documentary films of the time to be directed by a woman.

Filming began in August 1964.

While filming at the 1964 Tokyo Olympics, Cavill suffered a heart attack.

References

External links

The Dawn Fraser Story at National Film and Sound Archive

1964 films
Documentary films about sportspeople
Australian documentary films
1960s English-language films